The AHS Kryl is a 155 mm NATO-compatible self-propelled wheeled howitzer (or more precisely a gun-howitzer) designed in Poland by Centrum Produkcji Wojskowej Huta Stalowa Wola. It is a licensed copy of the Israeli ATMOS 2000 52-caliber gun mounted on a Polish Jelcz 663 armoured 6×6 chassis and integrating WB Electronics' "Topaz" artillery fire control system. 

The prototype was built by June 2014. A series production was planned from 2021 but never starts.

Comparable artillery systems

Archer
DRDO ATAGS
ATMOS 2000
A-222 Bereg
2S22 Bohdana
CAESAR
DANA
G6 Rhino
Nora B-52
PCL-09
PCL-161
PCL-181
PLL-09
Type 19 
ZUZANA

See also
AHS Krab

Notes

References

Self-propelled howitzers of Poland
Science and technology in Poland
155 mm artillery
Wheeled self-propelled howitzers